Cerkwica  (German Zirkwitz) is a village in the administrative district of Gmina Karnice, within Gryfice County, West Pomeranian Voivodeship, in north-western Poland.

In 1946–1998 the settlement was a part of the Szczecin Voivodeship. The population in 2004 was 1261 inhabitants.

There's the Volunteer Fire Department Station in Cerkwica, part of the country-wide system of a volunteer fire department (VFD) outlets. Before 1945 the area was part of Nazi Germany. For the history of the region, see History of Pomerania.

References

Villages in Gryfice County